A dragoon is a soldier who fights on foot, but relocates on horseback.

Dragoon may also refer to:

Places
Dragoon, Arizona, an unincorporated community in Cochise County, Arizona
Dragoon Mountains, a mountain range in Arizona, USA

Military
Dragoon AFV, an American armoured fighting vehicle
Operation Dragoon, the Allied invasion of Southern France during World War II
Stryker Dragoon, an American infantry fighting vehicle
M47 Dragon, an American anti-tank guided missile

Arts, entertainment, and media

Fictional entities 

 Dragoon, Tyson Granger's bit-beast in Beyblade
 Dragoon, a character class in the Final Fantasy series
 Dragoon, a Legendary Air Ride Machine in Kirby Air Ride 
 Dragoon, a Protoss mechanized infantry unit from the Blizzard computer game StarCraft
 Acacia Dragoons, the military force in the video game Chrono Cross
 Egg Dragoon, a boss in the video games,  Sonic Unleashed and Sonic Generations
 Magma Dragoon, a boss character from the game Mega Man X4

Games
Panzer Dragoon (series), a series of Sega video games 
Panzer Dragoon, a 1995 rail-shooter Sega Saturn videogame
The Legend of Dragoon, a 1999 role-playing PlayStation videogame

Other arts, entertainment, and media
Dragoon (anime), a 1997 anime film

Other uses
Dragoon (pigeon), a variety of domestic pigeon
Colt Dragoon Revolver, a handgun

See also
 Dragon (disambiguation)